NTC Tower, or National Telecommunications Corporation Tower is a building in Khartoum, Sudan. The 29 story office building was completed in 2009, construction having begun in 2005.  The contractor is the Turkish company AINA International.

Solar technology
This tower incorporates solar technologies in the building, for electricity generation (photovoltaics), as ways to lessen the demand for cooling, and light tubes to bring sunlight to the interior spaces.

See also
Skyscraper design and construction
List of tallest buildings in Africa

References

Buildings and structures in Khartoum
Residential buildings completed in 2009